Tõnu Naissoo (born 18 March 1951) is an Estonian composer and jazz pianist.

Tõnu Naissoo was born in Tallinn. He is the son of composer Uno Naissoo. He began studying classical piano at the age of six at the Tallinn Music School, graduating in 1970 with a degree in music theory. In 1982 he graduated from the Tallinn State Conservatory in composition under instruction from Eino Tamberg.

He has played on several musical groups, including Tõnu Naissoo Trio, Optimistid (1967–1968), Collage (1967–1972), Sinilind (1971–1972), Laine (1972–1976), Synthesis (1977–1980), Kaseke (1980–1981). About 30 years he has been a pianist in the Viru Hotel.

He has written music for films and theatrical stages.

Awards:
 1991: Estonian Radio's Musician of the Year
 2011: Music Prize of the Estonian Music Council
 2020: Order of the White Star, V class.

References

Living people
1951 births
Estonian pianists
20th-century Estonian composers
21st-century Estonian composers
Estonian film score composers
Recipients of the Order of the White Star, 5th Class
Estonian Academy of Music and Theatre alumni
Musicians from Tallinn